Orciano di Pesaro is a frazione of the  comune of Terre Roveresche in the Province of Pesaro e Urbino in the Italian region Marche, located about  west of Ancona and about  south of Pesaro. It is located on a hill dividing the valleys of the Metauro and Cesano rivers. It was a separate comune until 2017.

References

Former municipalities of the Marche